In image Noise reduction, local pixel grouping is the algorithm to remove noise from images using principal component analysis (PCA).

Image denoising

Sensors such as CCD, CMOS or ultrasonic probe may encapsulate noise signal. Noise reduction is commonly used to improve quality of the image. However, techniques such as smoothing filters and many other algorithms may lose local structure of image while denoising the image. More over, efficiency is also taken into consideration.

Principal component analysis
 
PCA was invented in 1901 by Karl Pearson, to transform original dataset into linearly uncorrelated PCA domain. PCA works in the way that principal components with larger possible variance are preserved while discarding low variance components.

Image denoising by principal component analysis with local pixel grouping(LPG-PCA) was developed by Lei et. in 2010. It is based on the assumption that the energy of a signal will concentrate on a small subset of the PCA transformed dataset, while the energy of noise will evenly spread over the whole dataset.
In order to denoising , first a train dataset  must be constructed using local pixel group. Using this  and apply PCA the noise in the image can be reduced.

Construct local pixel group
For each pixel  in the image, select a  window centered at  denoted by 

Take the pixels in each possible  block within the  training block yields  samples . If the distance between a sample and the center window  is smaller than some threshold, then accept the sample. So the train dataset  is acquired by put all the accepted sample together as column vectors into a matrix.

Denoising using local pixel group
Apply  to  we have

The covariance matrix of  can also be calculated by

Apply this to all the pixels in the image and the denoised image can be obtained.
Experiments by Lei show that LGP-PCA can effectively preserve the image fine structures while smoothing noise. The solution is competitive compared with other algorithms such as Block-matching algorithm.

References

External links
Lei's homepage and matlab code of LPG-PCA

Computer-related introductions in 2010
Image noise reduction techniques